The Campeonato Brasileiro Sub-23, also knowly has Campeonato Brasileiro de Futebol de Aspirantes is the official Brazilian national football tournament for U-23 teams.

List of champions

Following there are all the championship editions:

Titles by club

See also
 Campeonato Brasileiro Sub-20
 Campeonato Brasileiro Sub-17

References

 
5
Youth football competitions in Brazil
5
Under-23 association football
Sports leagues established in 2010